Rescue Chamber can refer to:
 McCann Rescue Chamber, a device for rescuing submariners from a submarine that is unable to surface
 Mine rescue chamber, an emergency shelter installed in underground environments.

See also
 Escape Room (disambiguation)
 Escape crew capsule
 Escape pod